This is a list of properties and districts in Cook County, Georgia that are listed on the National Register of Historic Places (NRHP).

Current listings

|}

References

Cook
Buildings and structures in Cook County, Georgia